Selsey Abbey  was founded by St Wilfrid in AD 681 on land donated at Selsey by the local Anglo-Saxon ruler, King Æðelwealh of Sussex, Sussex's first Christian king. The Kingdom of Sussex was the last area of Anglo-Saxon England to be evangelised.

The abbey became the seat of the Sussex bishopric, until it was moved, after a synod in 1075, to Chichester. The location of the abbey was probably at the site of, what became, the old parish church at Church Norton just north of modern-day Selsey.

Historical context
The founder of Selsey Abbey was the exiled St Wilfrid of Northumbria. Wilfrid had spent most of his career in exile having quarrelled with various kings and bishops. He arrived in the kingdom of the South Saxons in 681 and remained there for five years evangelising and baptising the people. The account given by Wilfrid's biographer Stephen in his Life of Wilfrid infers that all of the South Saxons were pagan, whereas Bede's Ecclesiastical History contradicts this: Bede says that the local king Æðelwealh and his wife Eafe plus the leading thegns and soldiers had already been baptised in Mercia; then he goes on to say that only Queen Eafe was baptised. 

Kirby suggests that Stephen's Life of Wilfrid was extremely partisan, as its purpose was to magnify Wilfrid as well as vindicate him. Also that Queen Eafe was the daughter of Wulfhere the Christian king of Mercia, and that Æðelwealh and his nobles would have been baptised at the Mercian court, and on their return to Sussex, Wulfhere will have sent a number of priests with them, to baptise the ordinary people. He further speculates that Christianity may have secured a foothold in early Sussex via one of its sons, the South Saxon Damian, bishop of Rochester , but the evidence is not certain.

When Wilfrid arrived in Sussex, there was a small community of five or six Irish monks led by Dicul in Bosham, however it seems that they had made little headway in evangelising the local people. It would not have been unusual to have found Irish monks in Sussex as during this period it was common to follow the Doctrine of Peregrinatio, a self-imposed exile to serve God. Also, the South of England generally was part of the overland route for the Irish travelling to the continent.

At the time of Wilfrid, it would have been a financial expedient to set up a See in an existing monastery rather than build a cathedral church from scratch. Kelly suggests that this may have been why the cathedra was originally set in Selsey rather than Chichester. According to the Domesday Book, at the time of Edward the Confessor the diocese of Selsey had been one of the poorest bishoprics in the country. After the Norman Conquest, however, the new Norman landholders could afford to spend large sums of money on buildings, including churches, so that the cost of translating the See to Chichester would not have been a problem.

Foundation and removal

King Æðelwealh gave Wilfrid a royal vill and 87 hides to build a monastery at Selsey. Bede says that one of Wilfrid's first acts was to free 250 slaves, who came with the estate, and baptise them. Wilfrid then went on to perform the deeds of Bishop in the area.

A 10th-century forged foundation charter credits Cædwalla with confirming the grant of land to Wilfrid. Cædwalla was a West Saxon prince who had apparently been banished by Centwine, king of Wessex. Cædwalla had spent his exile in the forests of the Chiltern and the Weald, and at some point had befriended Wilfrid. Cædwalla vowed that if Wilfrid would be his spiritual father then he would be his obedient son.
After entering into this compact, they faithfully fulfilled it, with Wilfrid providing the exile with all kinds of aid.

Eventually, Cædwalla invaded the kingdom of the South Saxons and slew King Æðelwealh. Æðelwealh's successors, Berthun and Andhun, drove Cædwalla out, but after the death of Centwine, Cædwalla was able to become King of the West Saxons. He then conquered the South Saxons, killing Berthun in the process. Cædwalla immediately summoned Wilfrid and made him supreme counsellor over his whole kingdom.

In about 686 Archbishop Theodore resolved to arbitrate between the various parties to end Wilfrid's exile. He was successful in his efforts and Wilfrid returned north. With Wilfrid gone, Selsey was absorbed by the Diocese of the West Saxons, at Winchester. In temporal matters Sussex was subject to the West Saxon kings, and in ecclesiastical matters it was subject to the bishops of Winchester. By AD 705 the West Saxon Diocese had grown to such a size that it became unwieldy to manage, so King Ine, Cædwalla's successor, resolved with his witan to divide the great diocese. Accordingly, a new see was created at Sherborne and four years later the See of Selsey was created. Wilfrid had been in charge of the religious community at Selsey. When he left he probably would have nominated a president, and any subsequent vacancy would have been filled by election. Abbot Eadberht of Selsey would have been president of the brotherhood in 709 and according to Bede was consecrated the first Bishop of the South Saxons Diocese by synodal decree.

From the time of Wilfrid till after the Norman Conquest, when the See was transferred to Chichester, there were about twenty-two Bishops over a period of 370 years. The See was transferred after the Council of London of 1075, which decreed that Sees should be centred in cities. Some sources claim that Stigand, who was bishop at the time of the transfer, continued to use the title Bishop of Selsey until 1082, before adopting the new title of Bishop of Chichester, indicating that the move took several years to complete.

There is a dearth of documents for the early church in Sussex, with gaps in the lists. Most of the documents that do survive are later copies or forgeries, which has made it impossible to reconstruct a detailed history before the Norman Conquest.

Location

The location of the old Selsey Abbey and cathedral church is not known for sure, although some local legends suggest that it is under the sea, and that the bell can be heard tolling during rough weather. This is thought not to be true and probably was due to Camden's reference to some obscure remains of that ancient little city, in which those Bishops resided, covered at high water, but plainly visible at low water. Wilfrid's church, in reality, was more likely to have been at the site of, what became, the old 13th century parish church at Church Norton.  

There is some supporting evidence for this. An excavation, in 1911, of the 'mound' that adjoins the current St Wilfrid's chapel yielded a 10th-century bronze belt tab of a type found in ecclesiastical contexts. Also various stone artefacts have been found in the area including remnants of Wilfrid's palm cross, that would have stood outside his cathedral. The design on the remains of the cross are similar to those on the Bewcastle Cross and it is thought that the Selsey cross would have been identical to the one at Bewcastle. Bishop William Reade, in his will dated 1382, requested that he should be buried before the high altar of the church at Selsey ... once the cathedral church of my diocese.

In another will dated 1545, Geoffrey Thomson, a Rector of Selsey, asked to be buried next to the palm cross in the churchyard.

On the top left of the painting that hangs in the south transept of Chichester Cathedral, created by the early Tudor painter Lambert Barnard, is a representation of the old church and bell tower at Church Norton as it appeared in the 16th century. The 1911 excavation of the mound revealed some strong stone foundations for a square tower and the remains of a ringwork.  It is probable that the foundations were for the bell tower, shown separate from the church on the Barnard painting. The tower would have been constructed in the 11th century or earlier as a fortification and not actually part of the church. A churchwarden's presentment from 1662 stated "That there was never any steeple belonging to the church (at Selsey), but a tower formerly belonging to a ruined castle, somewhat remote from the church where the bells hung...". It seems that the old tower lasted till 1602 when it blew down. A replacement tower was constructed, this time attached to the church, in 1662. The ringwork was possibly established soon after 1066 and as the bishopric was not moved to Chichester till after 1075, it is likely that it was constructed to protect Wilfrid's 7th-century church.

Plague and pestilence
In 681, while Eappa was Abbot at the Monastery, the country was ravaged by a plague. As the monastery was also badly afflicted by this disease, the monks set apart three days of fasting and prayer to try to placate the Divine Wrath.

A young boy, in his prayers, appealed to Saint Oswald. Then Saint Peter and Saint Paul were said to have appeared to the boy, at Oswalds request. They told him that all in the Monastery would be cured of the plague apart from the boy.

According to Bede:

Land seizure and restoration
In the middle of the 10th century a certain Brihthelm appears as bishop in a couple of the Selsey charters, dated 956 and 957.
The charter of 957(S.1291) tells how Brihthelm restores 42 hides of land in the Selsey area to the South Saxons.

The original foundation confirmed by Cædwalla to Wilfrid was 87 hides. According to Brihthelm the land was fraudulently seized from the church by a certain Ælfsige, against the canons of the Council of Nicaea (325), when he was raised to the episcopal seat of the 'Gewisse' (West Saxons). Several historians have suggested that the Council of Nicaea reference that bishops should not take over another bishops land infers that the Ælfsige who seized the lands at Selsey, would have been a bishop. The most likely candidate was the Bishop of Winchester (whose name was also Ælfsige) and according to Bede the South Saxon Church was subject to the Bishops of Winchester at the time.

Fictional reference
Rudyard Kipling wrote about St Wilfrid and Selsey and in this poem where he refers to a service at Manhood End (Selsey) that was conducted by Wilfrid's chaplain Stephen of Ripon, referred to as Eddi in the poem:
Eddi's Service (AD 687)
Eddi, priest of St. Wilfrid
In his chapel at Manhood End,
Ordered a midnight service
For such as cared to attend.

But the Saxons were keeping Christmas,
And the night was stormy as well.
Nobody came to service,
Though Eddi rang the bell.

"'Wicked weather for walking,"
Said Eddi of Manhood End.
"But I must go on with the service
For such as care to attend."

The altar-lamps were lighted, –
An old marsh-donkey came,
Bold as a guest invited,
And stared at the guttering flame.

The storm beat on at the windows,
The water splashed on the floor,
And a wet, yoke-weary bullock
Pushed in through the open door.

"How do I know what is greatest,
How do I know what is least?
That is My Father's business,"
Said Eddi, Wilfrid's priest.

"But – three are gathered together –
Listen to me and attend.
I bring good news, my brethren!"
Said Eddi of Manhood End.

And he told the Ox of a Manger
And a Stall in Bethlehem,
And he spoke to the Ass of a Rider,
That rode to Jerusalem.

They steamed and dripped in the chancel,
They listened and never stirred,
While, just as though they were Bishops,
Eddi preached them The World,

Till the gale blew off on the marshes
And the windows showed the day,
And the Ox and the Ass together
Wheeled and clattered away.

And when the Saxons mocked him,
Said Eddi of Manhood End,
"I dare not shut His chapel
On such as care to attend."
Rudyard Kipling Rewards and Fairies. p 179.

See also
 History of Sussex
 History of Christianity in Sussex

Notes

Citations

References

 
 			
 
 
 	
 
 
 	
 	
 
 
 
 
  – booklet produced by the author	(1st Edition 1935) for visitors to St Peters church, Selsey.

External links

 Prosopography of Anglo-Saxon England.   Location: Selsey
 Manhood Partnership- Contains an aerial photo' of the possible site of the Abbey at Church Norton. Plus other archaeological information.

Anglo-Saxon cathedrals
 
Buildings and structures in West Sussex
History of West Sussex
Monasteries in West Sussex
Diocese of Chichester
Christian monasteries established in the 7th century
History of Sussex
Selsey
Churches completed in 681
7th-century church buildings in England